Sheikh Saleh bin Mohammed Al Talib (born 23 January 1974), is a Saudi scholar, preacher, Imam, Khatib and judge who has been imprisoned since August 2018 for challenging mixed public gatherings. Within hours of his arrest, his English and Arabic Twitter accounts were deactivated.

Sheikh Al-Talib was the Imam and Khatib of Al-Masjid al-Haram and was also serving as a judge in District Court in Makkah.

In March 2018, Sheikh Talib visited Pakistan where he met with officials such as then President Mamnoon Hussain and Army Chief Qamar Javed Bajwa.

References

Living people
Saudi Arabian Islamic religious leaders
Saudi Arabian prisoners and detainees
Saudi Arabian imams
Saudi Arabian Muslims
Saudi Arabian Quran reciters
Sharia judges
People from Riyadh
1974 births